Žulová (until 1948 Frýdberk) is a town in Jeseník District in the Olomouc Region of the Czech Republic. It has about 1,200 inhabitants.

Administrative parts

The village of Tomíkovice is an administrative part of Žulová.

Geography
The Vidnavka stream flows through the town.

It is the largest pond in the area.

History
The first written mention of Frýdberk is from the 13th century, when the Frýdberk Castle was built. The settlement was first referred to as a town in 1358. It was part of the Duchy of Nysa under Bohemian suzerainty. In the 15th century, silver was mined here and two glassworks were in operation. The castle was renaissance reconstructed in 1594.

The development of the town ended with the Thirty Years' War. In 1639, the castle was conquered and demolished by the Swedish and Polish troops. The town was looted in 1642 and destroyed by a fire in 1657. In the second half of the 17th century, Frýdberk recovered and began to expand. In 1793, the town privileges were restored.

Following the duchy's dissolution in 1850, it was incorporated directly into Bohemia. In the 19th century, the town of became a centre of stone mining and processing, especially granite.

From 1938 to 1945 it was occupied by Germany within which it was one of the municipalities in Sudetenland. During World War II, the Germans operated the E167 forced labour subcamp of the Stalag VIII-B/344 prisoner-of-war camp at a quarry in Žulová, and the E120 subcamp of Stalag VIII-B/344 at a quarry in Tomíkovice.

Transport
Žulová lies on a railway line of local importance from Javorník to Lipová-lázně.

Gallery

References

External links

Populated places in Jeseník District
Cities and towns in the Czech Republic
Czech Silesia